Ancahuachana (possibly from Quechua anka black-chested buzzard-eagle or eagle, wacha birth, to give birth -na a suffix, "where the eagle is born") or Mama Rosa is a mountain in the Vilcanota mountain range in the Andes of Peru, about  high. It is situated in the Cusco Region, Quispicanchi Province, in the districts of Camanti and Marcapata. Ancahuachana lies northeast of Singrenacocha and east of Colquepunco.

References

Mountains of Peru
Mountains of Cusco Region
Glaciers of Peru